Ross Frederick George was a talented sign painter, inventor, and type designer who resided in Seattle, Washington. He learned to letter from William Hugh Gordon.

George and Gordon were asked to design pens for Hunt Pen Company in 1913. By 1915 the pens were patented, and then put into production. The pens included A-style, B-style, C-style, D-style, and E-style nibs that reportedly cut the labor time of the lettering artist in half. George then proceeded to produce a periodical Speedball Text Book which was a way for him to provide insight to those who wished to learn the art of lettering and sign painting.  He created numerous editions until his death in 1959. His last was the 17th edition, although he had some involvement with the 18th edition.

In 1929, Ross F. George received a patent for a noiseless switch.

References 

Art Chantry, "Ross F. George: typographic man of mystery", pp. 125–129 in Art Chantry Speaks: A Heretic's History of 20th Century Graphic Design, Feral House, 2015 .

External links 

   Ross F. George mentioned in the Hunt Manufacturing Company history under the Speedball® Pen''
   Ross F. George mentioned in the second paragraph "In the Early twentieth century"
  Ross F. George Story by Luc Devroye, McGill University, Montreal, Canada
  Scroll or Search for George, Ross F. mentioning a 1932(c) Speedball copy book

American calligraphers
American graphic designers
Year of birth missing
Year of death missing
20th-century American inventors